Lillehammer Olympic Village was an artificial village constructed in Lillehammer, Norway, to accommodate 2,300 athletes and leaders during the 1994 Winter Olympics, and subsequently a smaller number during the 1994 Winter Paralympics. The Hamar Olympic Subsite Village was in Hamar; part of Toneheim Folk High School, it was able to accommodate 500 athletes and leaders.

Lillehammer
It was built on a  property and had  of real estate. This gave a capacity for 2,300 athletes and leaders from 67 nations. In addition, there was a  service center, including a  cafeteria which could serve 2,000 people simultaneously. There were security posts at the entrance to the village, with bus stops, parking and a reception further in. Heating was provided by electricity, solar power, gas and geothermal heat.

Each team was allocated a common area after the size of the team.

Construction started in 1992 and the first house was completed on 10 August. The village, consisting of wooden buildings, including parts in glue-laminated wood, was completed in December 1993 costing 250 million Norwegian krone (NOK). However, the reception building was made of aluminum modules, allowing it to be moved afterwards. During the games, it was rented by the Lillehammer Olympic Organizing Committee. The village consisted of a permanent part of 185 houses; of which 141 were sold privately after the games. Re-building and dismounting started in April 1994. The service center was afterwards converted to a cafeteria, senior center, a church and a nursery school. The rest of the buildings were mobile and sold to other parts of the country after the games. The temporary part was built on farmland which was taken into use as such from 1996.

Hamar

The Hamar Olympic Subsite Village was located at Toneheim Folk High School in Hamar,  from Vikingskipet. In addition to the schools dormitory, the surrounding land was used to construct temporary estate. The Hamar site was used for athletes competing in Hamar, which consisted of speed skating, short track speed skating and figure skating.

References

Bibliography
 

Venues of the 1994 Winter Olympics
Buildings and structures in Lillehammer
Olympic Villages